Henry DeHaven Moorman (June 9, 1880 – February 3, 1939) was a U.S. Representative from Kentucky.

Born on a farm near Glen Dean, Kentucky, Moorman attended the public schools.
He studied law.
He was admitted to the bar in 1900 and commenced practice in Hardinsburg.
He also engaged in agricultural pursuits and in banking.
County judge of Breckinridge County 1905–1909 and Commonwealth attorney of the ninth judicial district 1914–1927.
He served in the Spanish–American War as a private in Company C, First Regiment, Kentucky Volunteer Infantry, with service in Puerto Rico.
During the First World War enlisted in the United States Army on January 14, 1918, and was assigned to Headquarters Company, Tenth Field Artillery.
He was promoted to corporal and assigned to duty with the Judge Advocate General, Headquarters, Service of Supply, and was discharged April 1, 1919.

Moorman was elected as a Democrat to the Seventieth Congress (March 4, 1927 – March 3, 1929).
He was an unsuccessful candidate for reelection in 1928 to the Seventy-first Congress.
He resumed his former professional and business pursuits in Hardinsburg, Kentucky.
He died while on a visit in Hot Springs, Arkansas, February 3, 1939.
He was interred in Ivy Hill Cemetery, Hardinsburg, Kentucky.

References

1880 births
1939 deaths
United States Army soldiers
Democratic Party members of the United States House of Representatives from Kentucky
People from Breckinridge County, Kentucky
People from Hardinsburg, Kentucky
20th-century American politicians